is a Japanese rugby union player who plays as a Wing. He currently plays for Toyota Verblitz in Japan's domestic Top League.

International
Takahashi received his first call-up for his country on 27 May 2021, as an injury replacement for Shota Emi on Japan's tour of Scotland and Ireland.

References

External links
itsrugby.co.uk Profile

1996 births
Living people
Japanese rugby union players
Rugby union wings
Toyota Verblitz players